Pythagoras of Samos (Greek: Πυθαγόρας ο Σάμιος) lived in the period around the last part of 6th century BC and early 5th century BC, and was an ancient Greek boxer and a winner in boxing at the  ancient Olympic Games.

One of the most popular festivals of ancient Greece were the Olympic Games, participation in which was the great dream of Pythagoras. In 588 BC, although he was still a boy, he decided to give the oath of sixteen months' training to take part in the games. During the 48th Olympiad, Pythagoras of Samos was excluded from the boys' boxing contest and was mocked for being effeminate, but he went on to the men's contest and defeated all his opponents.

References 

Ancient Samians
Ancient Greek boxers
Ancient Olympic competitors
6th-century BC Greek people
6th-century BC births
Year of death unknown
Greek male boxers